The Caloplaca Hills are a distinctive group of rock hills including Mount Carmer and Heathcock Peak, lying east of the Watson Escarpment on the west side of Reedy Glacier. They were mapped by the United States Geological Survey from surveys and from United States Navy aerial photographs, 1960–64. The name was suggested by J.H. Mercer of the Institute of Polar Studies, Ohio State University, after Caloplaca, the type of lichen found here.

References
 

Hills of Marie Byrd Land